Alexander Pavlovich Chudakov (February 2, 1938, Shchuchinsk – October 3, 2005, Moscow) was a Russian philologist and writer, known for his study of Chekhov, and for the novel A Gloom is Cast Upon the Ancient Steps, which was awarded the Russian Booker Prize of the decade in 2011.

References

External links
 Александр Чудаков. Ложится мгла на старые ступени

1938 births
2005 deaths
Russian philologists
Soviet literary historians
Russian literary historians
Soviet male writers
20th-century Russian male writers
Moscow State University alumni
Academic staff of Moscow State University
20th-century philologists